

Zimri-Lim (Akkadian:  Zi-im-ri Li-im) was king of Mari c. 1775–1761 BCE.

Zimri-Lim was the son or grandson of Iakhdunlim, but was forced to flee to Yamhad when his father was assassinated by his own servants during a coup. He had a tenuous relationship with Andarig, with whom he battled and allied with occasionally. The city was occupied by Shamshi-Adad I, the king of Ekallatum, who put his own son Yasmah-Adad on the throne. Shortly after the death of Shamshi-Adad I, Zimri-Lim returned from exile and was able to oust Yasmah-Adad from power with the help of Yarimlim, the king of Yamhad.

 There is an Akkadian literary text, written in the early years of his reign, entitled The Epic of Zimri-Lim.

Zimri-Lim ruled Mari for about thirteen years, and campaigned extensively to establish his power in the neighboring areas along the Euphrates and the Khabur valley. He extended his palace in the city, which was possibly the largest at the time, containing over 260 rooms at the ground level, and certainly the envy of other kings. It was destroyed by Hammurabi of Babylon.

He was also active on a wider stage, and for a time (perhaps about 1764 BCE) was allied with Hammurabi in his wars against Elam, Eshnunna, and Larsa. Zimri-Lim lent troops to Hammurabi's campaigns, and although the two kept extensive diplomatic contacts, it appears they never met in person.

After the defeat of Elam, there was no outside force to keep the precarious balance of power between the Kings of Mesopotamia. The alliance between Zimri-Lim and Hammurabi deteriorated after Babylon's conquest of Larsa. In 1762 BCE, Hammurabi conquered and sacked Mari (though it may be that the city had surrendered without a fight), despite the previous alliance. At this time Zimri-Lim disappears from historical view, and is presumed to have been killed.

Zimri-Lim's personal life is partly known through tablets preserved in the state archive of Mari. He married Shibtu, a princess of Yamkhad (Aleppo and surrounding territory), and is known to have had at least eight daughters through various wives. Several of his daughters were married to rulers of local towns, and two others are known to have become priestesses. Correspondence between the king and his daughters provides evidence that Zimri-Lim thought highly of women and considered them competent at making decisions.

See also

 Investiture of Zimri-Lim
 List of Mesopotamian dynasties

References

Sources

 
 Charpin, D. (1992). "Les legendes de sceaux de Mari: Nouvelles Données". In Young, Gordon D. (ed.). Mari in Retrospect: Fifty Years of Mari and Mari Studies. Eisenbrauns. pp. 59–76. ISBN 978-0-931464-28-7.
 Pappi, Cinzia. "Religion and Politics at the Divine Table: The Cultic Travels of Zimrī-Līm". Organization, Representation, and Symbols of Power in the Ancient Near East: Proceedings of the 54th Rencontre Assyriologique Internationale at Würzburg 20–25 Jul, edited by Gernot Wilhelm, University Park, USA: Penn State University Press, 2022, pp. 579-590
 Heimpel, Wolfgang. "2. Reconstruction of Events during Years 9` to 11` of Zimri-Lim’s Reign". Letters to the King of Mari: A New Translation, with Historical Introduction, Notes, and Commentary, University Park, USA: Penn State University Press, 2021, pp. 37-164
 Miglio, Adam E.. "ZIMRI-LIM’S CONDUCT OF INTERNATIONAL POLITICS". Tribe and State: The Dynamics of International Politics and the Reign of Zimri-Lim, Piscataway, NJ, USA: Gorgias Press, 2014, pp. 109-186
 
 
 
 
  Van de Mieroop, Marc (2005). King Hammurabi of Babylon (Third ed.). Malden, MA: Blackwell Publishing. pp. 16–78. ISBN 1-4051-2660-4. 
 Válek, František, "The Epic of Zimrī-Lîm.", Masters Dissertation, Czech Institute of Egyptology, Univerzita Karlova, Filozofická fakulta, 2022.

18th-century BC rulers
Kings of Mari
18th-century BC deaths
Year of birth unknown
Kings of the Universe
18th-century BC people